Sinai Jewish Primary School is a large three form entry voluntary aided modern orthodox Jewish primary school, under the auspices of the United Synagogue and is situated in Kenton in the London Borough of Brent. It is a co-educational primary school for up to 690 children aged 3–11. The school includes a nursery. It is the largest Jewish primary school in Europe. In addition to the name Michael Sobell Sinai School, the school is widely known and colloquially referred to as Sinai School.

History 
The Michael Sobell Sinai School started life as the Bayswater Jewish School, founded by members of the Bayswater Synagogue for the children of “poorer brethren”. Originally based at St James's Terrace, Harrow Road, the school opened its doors in 1866 at 1 Westbourne Park Villas. Eleven years later it moved to a new building in Harrow Road in 1879, and by the year 1903 it had accommodation large enough for and educated 419 pupils.

In 1902, 222 of its pupils took part in the Paddington Children's Coronation Procession.  In 1930, the school moved to Lancaster Road and  changed its name to Kensington Bayswater Jewish School, which later became Solomon Wolfson. 
 
The new Michael Sobell Sinai School (MSSS) opened in September 1981 with the pupils and staff coming from Solomon Wolfson and Yavneh schools to form the new nucleus of the school. 
There was far too little space to serve the pupils and staff of the already expanding school, and so the first ten-year plan was developed, and the school started to grow, with a new music room and computer suite, a dedicated learning block for Years Five and Six, a gymnasium, and a purpose-built block housing the school's nursery and reception classes.

With the appointment in April 1996 of Mrs Vivienne Orloff as Headteacher and Joanna Walker as Deputy Headteacher in 1997, the school grew into the largest Jewish primary school in Europe. After leading the school for over 15 years, in December 2011 Mrs Vivienne Orloff retired.

In 2005, the Michael Sobell Sinai school was chosen for one of the first national "short Ofsted inspections", for which only the top schools were chosen.

On 25 September 2008, Michael Sobell Sinai School pupils interviewed the NASA astronaut Gregory Chamitoff through a live satellite link up while he was aboard the Space Shuttle. The event made national news. In April 2012 Robert Leach became the incumbent headteacher. In 2017, Robert Leach resigned as head teacher and Juliet Lipshaw took on the role.

Ofsted 
In January 2015, the school was inspected by Ofsted. The school was judged as Good in all five areas. The report states that this is a good school because;

 Senior leaders have high expectations and ambitions for the school. They are determined to do what is necessary to achieve the very best for all pupils. 
 Leaders, including governors, make sure that the quality of teaching and pupil achievement continues to improve rapidly. 
 Teachers enthuse their pupils to want to learn and achieve their best. Teaching secures good progress. In some year groups, pupils make outstanding progress in reading and writing. 
 Pupils are articulate, mature and thoughtful learners. They behave well. The school keeps pupils exceptionally safe and secure. 
 Disadvantaged pupils, disabled pupils and those with special educational needs make more progress than all other pupils.
 The early years provision is good. Children are happy, confident and inquisitive learners. Teaching meets the needs of all children. From their starting points, children make good progress in all areas of
 learning.
 The school's faith ethos promotes pupils’ spiritual, moral, social and cultural development exceptionally well. Pupils are proud to be Jewish. They also enjoy working with pupils from different ethnic and
 religious backgrounds. They are exceptionally well prepared for life in modern Britain.

The school was also commended by Sir Michael Wilshaw, head of Ofsted for its work with children from different ethnic and religious backgrounds. "Schools like Sinai Jewish Primary School in Brent, where inspectors found that pupils are “proud to be Jewish” but also “enjoy working with pupils from different ethnic and religious backgrounds”.

The school was previously inspected in March 2010, and was also graded as a Good school. The inspection report states that "This is a good school. The pupils enjoy school, feel safe and make a good contribution to the community. They are polite and effectively embrace the school's ethos of welcoming new pupils and visitors to the school".

Pikuach 
This inspection of the school was carried out under section 48 of the Education Act 2005 and in March 2010. The main findings of the report stated that "The quality of Jewish education at Michael Sobell Sinai School is good overall" and in the Early Years Foundation Stage, it is outstanding. Pupils are happy and they work hard. Parents are pleased with the school as evidenced from the parents’ questionnaires which were overwhelmingly positive." 
The report continues "Children in the Early Years Foundation Stage make outstanding progress. This is due to the outstanding quality of provision that ensures that they learn well both socially 
and academically in a safe and secure learning environment".

Results 
Sinai continues to produce high-level test results, and the majority of students achieve above-average levels in SATs. In 2013, the students earned a KS2 Average Point Score of 30.3, putting them on the higher end of all schools.

In 2013, the school came seventh in the Primary League Tables in Brent for its percentage of high-achieving pupils.

In 2013:
 The percentage of pupils attaining Level 4 or above in the Key Stage 2 Grammar, punctuation and spelling test was 87% which positioned it in the top 20% of all schools nationwide.
 The percentage of pupils attaining Level 4 or above in the Key Stage 2 in Writing was 94% which positioned it in the top 20% of all schools nationwide.
Progress Data shows that in 2013, 100% of pupils achieved expected progress in writing. This is an increase of five percentage points since 2012.

Facilities 
The school opened its doors on its current campus, which is located alongside JFS in September 1981. The school has expanded and now has three buildings for its pupils, including a separate Early Years Foundation Stage block, a full-size gymnasium and an Upper Key Stage 2 block. The school has undergone an intensive refurbishment programme in recent years and now has a dedicated art room, IT Hub and Computing Room, film studio and a large multiuse games area.

History of heads and deputies of the school 
1981
 Headteacher Mr David Band z’’l (also head of Solomon Wolfson)
 1st Deputy Mrs Myrna Glass (also head of Yavneh)
 2nd Deputy Head Mr Jeffrey Leader

1990
 Headteacher Mr Ian Lebens,
 Deputy Headteacher Mrs Myrna Glass,
 Deputy Headteacher Mrs Kathy Peters

1996 -
 Headteacher Mrs Vivienne Orloff
 Deputy Headteacher Mrs Joanna Walker
 Assistant Headteacher Mr Nicky Goldmeier

2012 -
 Headteacher Mr Robert Leach
 Deputy Headteacher Mrs Joanna Walker
 Assistant Headteacher Rabbi Nicky Goldmeier
 Assistant Headteacher Mrs Claire Gough

2014 -

 Headteacher Mr Robert Leach
 Deputy Headteacher Mrs Juliette Lipshaw
 Assistant Headteacher Rabbi Nicky Goldmeier
 Assistant Headteacher Mrs Claire Gough

2017 -
 Headteacher Mrs Juliette Lipshaw
 Assistant Headteacher Rabbi Nicky Goldmeier
 Assistant Headteacher Mrs Claire Gough

References

External links
 Sinai official website
 Sinai OFSTED report

Primary schools in the London Borough of Brent
Jewish schools in England
Voluntary aided schools in London
Kenton, London